Huayuan may refer to the following locations in China:

Huayuan County (花垣县), of Xiangxi Prefecture, Hunan
Huayuan Area (华苑), Nankai District, Tianjin
Towns (花园镇)
Huayuan, Huoqiu County, in Huoqiu County, Anhui
Huayuan, Xiaochang County, in Xiaochang County, Hubei
Huayuan, Dongkou, in Dongkou County, Hunan
Huayuan, Leling, in Leling City, Shandong
Huayuan, Pi County, in Pi County, Sichuan
Huayuan, Santai County, in Santai County, Sichuan
Huayuan, Yuechi County, in Yuechi County, Sichuan
Village (花园村)
Huayuan, a village in Wenquan, Yingshan County, Huanggang, Hubei
Huayuan, a village in Xinghua Township, Hong'an County, Huanggang, Hubei